This page lists public opinion polls conducted for the 2015 French departmental elections, which were held in two rounds on 22 and 29 March 2015.

Unless otherwise noted, all polls listed below are compliant with the regulations of the national polling commission (Commission nationale des sondages) and utilize the quota method.

National

First round

By second round configuration 
The Ifop poll conducted from 23 to 24 March 2015 tested hypotheses in cantons in which specific configurations were present in the second round; the sample size provided represents the entire poll and not that within each configuration.

Left–right–FN

Left–right

Left–FN

Right–FN

Departmental projections 
The departmental projections below were constructed for the 93 departments of metropolitan France excluding Corse-du-Sud and Haute-Corse.

Cantonal projections

Aisne

Dordogne

Gard

Gironde

Landes

Pyrénées-Orientales

Essonne

Val-de-Marne

External links 
Notices of the French polling commission 

Opinion polling in France
France